Bungartz Butz is an automobile that was built in 1934 by Bungartz from Munich.

History
Towards the end of 1933, Dr. Everhard Bungartz, director of the newly established company Bungartz & Co., contacted Josef Ganz because he wanted to develop and build a small car according to his patents.

Technically the new Bungartz Butz model was very similar to the Standard Superior, introduced one year earlier. It featured a tubular chassis, a mid-mounted engine, and independent wheel suspension with swing-axles at the rear.

The Bungartz Butz was available in two basic versions: the Butz Cabrio-Limousine and the Butz Touren-Wagen. Both versions were two-seaters. The Butz had a plywood body covered in artificial leather and fitted with metal wings. The available colour schemes were either silvery gray, dark blue, sea green or beige, with black wings, wheel rims and chassis. Also available for the Butz was a special small trailer with backbone chassis and swing axles.

Notes and references

External links
Joseph Ganz Archive
Joseph Ganz Foundation
https://web.archive.org/web/20081016055947/http://www.schouwer-online.de/technik/bungartz.htm
http://www.bungartz.nl/hist-bungartz.html

Defunct motor vehicle manufacturers of Germany
Volkswagen Group